Knox College is a private liberal arts college in Galesburg, Illinois. It was founded in 1837 and offers more than 60 courses of study.

History

Knox College was founded as Knox Manual Labor College by Presbyterians and Congregationalists from New York state organized by George Washington Gale, who previously had founded the Oneida Institute. Gale in 1836 released a "Circular and Plan" for the founding of manual labor colleges which described a subscriber- and land purchase-based method of funding. His plan resulted in the founding of at least one school when in 1837 subscribers settled in what became Galesburg and began to build the college. Knox opened to students in 1843 and was one of the earliest colleges to admit Black people and women. Like Gale, many of the founders of Knox College and residents of Galesburg were abolitionists and actively supported the Underground Railroad.

Knox has been known by its present name since 1857. The name came about as a compromise among its founders. Though founded by a colony of Presbyterians and Congregationalists, the county where the college stands was already named Knox County, after Henry Knox, the first United States Secretary of War. Arguments have also been made that the college was named for Calvinist leader John Knox. It is not certain for which Knox it was named (if not both). George Candee Gale, a great-great-grandson of two of the founders, explains that

Contrary to general belief, Knox was not named for either General Knox or the Scottish Presbyterian Knox, according to my father.... Some wanted the college named for one Knox, some for the other; so they compromised on KNOX. Certainly most of them were pious enough to want the churchman and fighters enough to want the soldier as well.

Jonathan Blanchard's presidency led the school out of debt, but ignited a controversy about whether the school was loyal to the Congregational church or the Presbyterians. Gale and Blanchard were forced out of the school as a result. Knox was the site of the fifth debate between Abraham Lincoln and Stephen A. Douglas in 1858. The Old Main building is the only extant site of the debates. Two years after the debates, during his presidential campaign, Lincoln was awarded Knox College's first honorary doctorate—a Doctor of Laws degree, announced at the commencement exercises of 5 July 1860.

In 1841, a Female Seminary was built. The building burned down in 1843, but the college continued to provide classes for women, first in co-ed preparatory classes, then, by 1850, in the Female Collegiate Department. In 1857, a new 5-story Female Seminary building was constructed which accommodated up to ninety women. In 1867, the Knox College president William Curtis assaulted the Principal of the Female Seminary, Ada Howard. Curtis resigned after students protested and conducted a sit-down strike. In 1872, women were awarded college degrees for the first time at the college. As more women began to attend, the building was expanded in 1885. The addition was named Whiting Hall in recognition of the Principal of the Female Seminary Mrs. M. H. Whiting. In 1891, the college became fully co-ed. In 1892, the building was expanded again, and the entire building became Whiting Hall. It remained the sole women's dormitory until after WWII.

Academics

Knox employs a 3–3 academic calendar rather than a traditional semester-based approach. In each of the three 10-week terms, students take three courses. Faculty members teach two courses each term, giving them more time for one-on-one mentoring.

All courses of study at Knox contain common elements, including an educational plan that students design.

With the implementation of Renewed Knox, the 2003 curriculum overhaul, the school expanded its academic offerings to meet the needs of a 21st-century liberal arts education. In 2003, the Howard Hughes Medical Institute awarded the school $1 million to create a new major in neuroscience; in 2005, the college signed agreements with The George Washington University to create an early admission program into the university's medical school, and with the University of Rochester to create a direct admissions program into the university's Simon School of Business's MBA program; in 2007 the Peace Corps launched a new program at Knox, establishing the Peace Corps Preparatory Program, the first of its kind in the country; Chinese language instruction, Asian Studies, Environmental Studies, and Film Studies were all added; and new abroad studies programs have been created: the Japan Term, and Knox in New York.

Knox is also known for its Green Oaks term, an interdisciplinary program at the  Green Oaks Biological Field Station. The Green Field Station began in 1955 under the guidance of zoologists Paul Shepard and George Ward.

The most popular majors at Knox, based on 2021 graduates, were:
Business Administration and Management (28)
Research and Experimental Psychology (28)
Creative Writing (23)
Biology/Biological Sciences (21)
Computer Science (17)

Faculty
The Knox College faculty is made up of 120 professors, 95% of whom have a Ph.D. or equivalent degree. The student-faculty ratio is 11:1, while the average class size is 14. Prominent faculty members include psychologist Tim Kasser, Middle East expert Robert Seibert, Latin American Expert Karen Kampwirth, Evolutionary Psychologist Frank McAndrew, historian Mikiso Hane, noted expert on 20th-century American art and director of The National Center for Midwest Art and Design Gregory Gilbert, fiction writer Chad Simpson, and co-chairs of the Knox-based Lincoln Studies Center Rodney Davis and Douglas L. Wilson.

Lincoln Studies Center
Davis and Wilson established the Lincoln Studies Center in 1998. The center deals with issues relating to Lincoln's life and legacy by fostering new research, publishing monographs, hosting annual lectures and occasional symposia. Students are often employed as assistants in the various projects at the center. In August 2009, the National Endowment for the Humanities "We the People" initiative awarded Knox $850,000, "a grant that will provide the base of a permanent endowment for the Center."

Admission
According to the Carnegie Classification of Institutions of Higher Education, Knox is considered a more selective institution, with a lower rate of transfer-in students. In the fall of 2018, 2,738 students applied, 2,500 students were admitted, and 345 chose to enroll. Of the class of 2017, 34% of students were in the top tenth of their class and 66% in the top quarter. The ACT composite Mid-50% range was 24–30 and the SAT mid-50% Range 1190–1380.

Student body
1,258 students were enrolled at Knox in September 2019. They came from 45 states and territories and 49 countries. Forty percent of U.S. students are of color and 19% are international students. Women make up 57% of the student body, men 43%.

Tuition
The comprehensive cost (tuition, room, board and fees) of an academic year at Knox was $60,144 in 2019–2020. U.S. citizens are eligible for a wide array of need- and merit-based scholarships, as well as various federal and private loan programs. There are numerous avenues for on-campus employment during the academic year. The college offers scholarships to qualified international students who wish to take full advantage of an American liberal arts education. International students are also eligible for on-campus jobs.

According to the U.S. Department of Education, the median federal debt of Knox College graduates who received student loans was $27,000. In addition, only 63% of students who attended Knox earned, on average, more than those with only a high school diploma.

Student life

Greek organizations
Knox College is home to nine Greek-letter organizations, the oldest of which has been on campus since 1855. Providing a network of alumni to enhance job and life connections, fraternity (men's) and sorority (women's) chapters provide Knox students with living, organizational and learning opportunities. Through their respective inter-Greek governance organizations, chapters conduct a formal recruitment process during each winter term to ensure first-year students have a chance to adjust to college life and classes before joining. Most offer residential housing for members. Some chapters formerly present have closed; of these, alumni members are often still active with the college's alumni association, and recolonization of dormant chapters remains an opportunity for potential new founders.

Sororities
These organizations are governed by Knox's Panhellenic Council.
  Delta Delta Delta, 1889, NPC sorority
  Pi Beta Phi, 1872, NPC sorority
  Kappa Kappa Gamma, 2007, NPC sorority
  Alpha Sigma Alpha, 2010, NPC sorority

Fraternities
These organizations are governed by Knox's Interfraternity Council .
  Beta Theta Pi, 1855, NIC fraternity
  Lambda Chi Alpha, 1915–1934, dormant, NIC fraternity
  Phi Gamma Delta (FIJI), 1867, NIC fraternity
  Sigma Nu, 1891, NIC fraternity
  Tau Kappa Epsilon, 1912, NIC fraternity
  Phi Sigma Kappa, 1928–1955, dormant, NIC fraternity
  Sigma Chi, 2007, NIC fraternity

Traditions

Pumphandle is an annual tradition dating back to 1885 during which new members of the community are welcomed to Knox. On the afternoon before the start of the academic year, all members of the Knox community gather on the south lawn outside Old Main. The president of the college "leads the welcoming line, shaking each person's hand in turn. Everyone shakes the hands of those who have gone before, and the line grows, snaking around the campus."

Flunk Day is an annual spring carnival that allows students, staff, and faculty to mingle and have fun. Classes are canceled for the day as the student body turns its attention to a joke issue of the student newspaper, live music, inflatable bounce rooms, petting zoos, a mud pit, a paint fight, and a seniors vs faculty softball game. The date of Flunk Day changes every year and is a secret until the entire student body is awakened at around 5am on the day. Flunk Day is of particular significance since Knox College does not close for reasons other than winter break and spring break. Flunk Day is a time that students, staff, and faculty can all come together.

Student media
 The Knox Student — a weekly student newspaper
 Catch — a prize-winning literary magazine
 Cellar Door — a literary magazine
 The Common Room — online journal of literary criticism
  Quiver — a literary magazine of genre fiction
 X — a visual arts journal

The Knox Student has won numerous awards as one of the best college newspapers in the state of the Illinois, including numerous first-place category awards and general excellence awards from the Illinois College Press Association.

Knox's radio station is WVKC. It is on the fourth floor of George Davis Hall, a former science building that now houses the social science and language departments. Its frequency in Galesburg is 90.7. The Princeton Review ranked it #7 in the nation for "great college radio station" in its 2011 Best 368 Colleges.

Athletics

The Knox College mascot is the Prairie Fire, a name it adopted in 1993 due to sensitivity about its previous nickname, the Old Siwash. The word Siwash is a corruption of the French term "sauvage." This was a derogatory term used by European traders to refer to the indigenous people, with the French explorers experiencing Native American warfare tactics as barbaric and savage. The term Old Siwash was popularized by George Helgesen Fitch (Knox Class of 1897) in his Saturday Evening Post articles and a book At Good Old Siwash, and was adopted as the school's nickname. The term was widely used to denote small midwestern liberal arts colleges because of the popularity of Fitch's writings. In 1992 a college publication urged the school to reconsider the name given its additional previously unknown pejorative implications. The Prairie Fire refers to the annual spring burning of the prairie lands at Green Oaks. First conducted in the 1950s by Knox professor Paul Shepard, the burn protects prairie grasses from intrusions of woodland scrub and competition with "exotic" species that have been introduced to Illinois from other regions or countries to the detriment of organisms that have evolved over millions of years in delicate balance with the environment and each other.

Knox is a member of the Midwest Conference of the NCAA at the Division III level. The school offers 21 men's and women's varsity sports, as well as 11 club sports, including water polo, fencing, and ultimate frisbee. Recent athletic highlights include the 2016, 2017, & 2018 Conference Champion women's soccer teams that participated in the NCAA Division III National Tournament and the 2018 men's soccer team that did the same. All-American baseball player Drake Sykes had an outstanding 2016 season, two-time All-American wrestler Jaran Rutledge placed in the NCAA Division III National Tournament in 2007 (3rd) and 2008 (8th), and All-American high-jumper Austin Rauch finished sixth at the 2019 NCAA Division III Indoor track national championships.

Knox College and Monmouth College have the sixth-longest college football rivalry in the United States. The Bronze Turkey trophy, awarded annually to the victor of their game, was created in 1928 and is the brainchild of Knox football alumnus Bill Collins. ESPN named the Bronze Turkey the fifth "most bizarre college football rivalry trophy".

Transportation
Galesburg Transit provides Knox College students and faculty with free public transit within Galesburg.

Campus

Knox College has 45 academic and residential buildings on its  campus. It has electron microscopes, a gas chromatograph mass spectrometer, a 17-inch (0.43 m) Corrected Dall-Kirkham reflector telescope manufactured by Planewave Instruments, a Nuclear Magnetic Resonance spectrometer, access to the Inter University Consortium for Political & Social Research, the Strong Collection of 18th- and 19th-century maps and photographs, the Hughes Collection of manuscripts and first editions from Hemingway and his "Lost Generation" contemporaries, and a  natural prairie reserve, the Green Oaks Field Station. In 2018, a phased plan to renovate the Umbeck Science-Mathematics Center (SMC) was announced with classes being taught in the renovated space beginning with the winter term of 2020, with additional phases of renovations to follow. In 2006, the new E. & L. Andrew Fitness Center was dedicated. The , $2.4-million facility features state-of-the-art equipment, and is significantly larger than the former fitness center, Memorial Gymnasium.

The centerpiece of campus is Old Main, "the oldest building on its campus, and the best preserved site of one of the 1858 senatorial debates between Abraham Lincoln and Stephen Douglas", a National Historic Landmark and part of the National Register of Historic Places.

Built in 1928, the Seymour Library was ranked third "Best Library" in the nation by the Princeton Review in 2001. Inside its leaded glass windows and oak-paneled reading rooms, the library houses 350,000 books and more than 14,000 periodicals. Its special collections include the Finley Collection of Midwest History, the Strong Collection of 18th- and 19th-century maps and photographs, the Hughes Collection of manuscripts and first editions of Faulkner, Hemingway and his "Lost Generation" contemporaries, and an original Diderot Encyclopédie.

In 2002, a major curriculum revision called "Renewed Knox" was launched. With this revision came the creation of six new academic centers: The Center for Research and Advanced Studies, The Center for Global Studies, The Center for Career and Pre-Professional Development, The Center for Community Service, The Center for Teaching and Learning, and The Center for Intercultural Life.

Students established the Knox College Community Garden in 2007 as an independent study project. It continues to be tended by student volunteers, and produces a variety of annual and perennial vegetables and flowers.

U.S. Department of Education College Scorecard 
According to the U.S. Department of Education, 18% of students who started college at Knox College later transferred to another school.  This compares to the national average of over 30% of students transferring colleges. 16% of the entering class did not return after their first year.  This compares to a national average of 30% of college students who do not return after their first year. African Americans make up 13.4% of the U.S. population in general, about 8% of surrounding area, and they are 8% of the Knox College student body. Knox College graduates typically earn between $18,300 and $33,100, less than the average starting salary paid to college graduates, about $50,000, although there is great variation in both of these figures based on chosen majors and career paths. Knox alumni go into fields ranging from literature to neurosurgery. Furthermore, published earning data is skewed by the fact that a significant number of Knox students do not seek full time employment immediately after graduating from Knox, instead going on to pursue graduate degree programs, including PhDs, medical school, and law school, during which time work is delayed or only part time.

Alumni
Knox College has over 16,000 living alumni. The alumni giving rate was 24.5% in the 2019-20 giving year, with nearly 7,000 individuals contributing to the college.

Notable alumni

  Edgar Addison Bancroft — lawyer and diplomat, served as United States Ambassador to Japan 1924–1925
 Barry Bearak 1971 — New York Times journalist and visiting professor at Columbia University Graduate School of Journalism, winner of 2002 Pulitzer Prize for International Reporting
 Matt Berg 2000 — CEO of Ona, former director of ICT for Millennium Villages Project at Columbia University's Earth Institute; named in 2010 as one of the Time 100 Most Influential People of the World
Michael J. Budds, musicologist and professor at the University of Missouri School of Music.
 Earnest Elmo Calkins 1891 — founder of first modern advertising agency
 Amy Carlson 1990 — actress, known for NBC television series Third Watch, the CBS series Blue Bloods, and Law & Order: Trial by Jury
 Edgar D. Coolidge — dentist and endodontist, founding member of the American Association of Endodontists
 Job Adams Cooper 1867 — Sixth Governor of State of Colorado, 1889–1891
 Vir Das 2004 — comedian, Bollywood actor
 Charles Eastman — Native American physician, activist and Boy Scout official
 Ethyl Eichelberger — a famous drag queen, playwright and actor, for whom a prize was founded by downtown Manhattan theatre institution P.S. 122
 Bill Essick — former pitcher for Cincinnati Reds, baseball executive and scout
 Fred Ewing 1913 — physician, sixth head football coach of University of Oklahoma and first to require academically eligible players
 Eugene Field — poet, journalist, and author
 John Huston Finley 1887 — author, former president of Knox College,  president of City College of New York, associate editor of The New York Times
 Jack Finney 1934 — science-fiction author, works include The Body Snatchers and Time and Again
 George Helgesen Fitch 1897 — author, journalist, and humorist
 David P. Fridovich 1974 — retired lieutenant general and Green Beret in U.S. Army, former Deputy Commander of U.S. military's United States Special Operations Command
 Hobart R. Gay 1917 — U.S. Army general, served under General George S. Patton
 Robert Hanssen 1966 — FBI agent convicted of spying for Soviet Union and Russia in 2001, subject of film Breach (2007)
 Otto Harbach 1895 — songwriter for whom Knox's Harbach Theater is named
 Don Harmon 1988 — Illinois State Senator (Democrat) and 39th President of the Illinois Senate
Loyal M. Haynes 1918 — Brigadier General in U.S. Army, commanding general of second Division Artillery Unit in Korean War and survivor of the 1946 C-53 Skytrooper crash on the Gauli Glacier
 B. J. Hollars 2007 — author
 Bob Jamieson  — ABC news correspondent
 Frank J. Jirka Jr. 1944 — former president of American Medical Association
 Whitcomb Judson  — inventor of the zipper
 Nancy Becker-Kennedy - disability rights activist, writer, and actress.
 James M. Kilts 1970 — former CEO of Gillette
 Ismat Kittani 1951 — former Iraqi Ambassador to the United Nations and President of the United Nations General Assembly; helped start Knox's Honor System
 Alex Kuo 1961 — Distinguished Affiliated Scholar at Knox, author, winner of 2002 American Book Award
 Thomas Eugene Kurtz 1950 — co-inventor of BASIC computer language
 Charles Wesley Leffingwell 1862 — editor of The Living Church magazine
 Lorenzo D. Lewelling — 12th Governor of Kansas
 Don Marquis — author and journalist
 Edgar Lee Masters — poet and novelist, best known as author of Spoon River Anthology (1915)
 S. S. McClure 1882 — muckraking journalism pioneer, founder of McClure's Magazine
 Todd Monken 1989 — former professional football coach, former head coach at Southern Mississippi University; currently offensive coordinator for the University of Georgia
 Ander Monson 1997 — novelist and poet, author of Other Electricities, and Vacationland, a collection of poems
 John Podesta 1971 — Chief of Staff for President Bill Clinton
 Rose Polenzani — independent folk musician
 Gene Rayburn — announcer for The Tonight Show; host of The Match Game and other game shows
 Hiram Rhodes Revels — AME and Methodist Episcopal minister, and first black U.S. Senator (1870–1871)
 Barnabas Root 1870 — one of the first black men to receive a college degree in Illinois
 Ezekiel S. Sampson — U.S. Representative and lawyer from Iowa
 Don Samuelson — 25th governor of Idaho (1967–1971)
 Ellen Browning Scripps 1859 — newspaper magnate, philanthropist; helped found Scripps College and Scripps Institution of Oceanography
 Robert Seibert 1963 — Professor Emeritus at Knox College and author of Politics and Change in the Middle East
 Joseph J. Sisco 1941 — diplomat under Henry Kissinger; president of American University (1976–1980)
 Clare Snider Smith 1973 – printmaker who studied at Atelier 17, a prominent art studio in Paris, France
 Zack Stephenson 2006 — Minnesota State Representative (2019–present)
 Dorothea Tanning 1932 — surrealist painter; wife of surrealist painter Max Ernst
 Kathryn Tanquary 2010 — author of juvenile fiction novel The Night Parade
 Mary Allen West 1855 — journalist and temperance worker
 Allan Arthur Willman 1928 — classical pianist, 20th-century composer, chair of University of Wyoming music department
 John Wozniak 1999 - Football player and Division 1 football coach

References

External links

 Official website

 
1837 establishments in Illinois
Education in Knox County, Illinois
Educational institutions established in 1837
Liberal arts colleges in Illinois
American manual labor schools
Private universities and colleges in Illinois